The sixteenth season of ABC reality television series The Bachelor premiered on January 2, 2012. This show features a previous contestant from The Bachelorette, a winemaker and owner of Envolve wines, from Sonoma, California, 29-year-old Ben Flajnik, who finished runner-up in the seventh season of the show featuring Ashley Hebert. This season returns with 25 women featured in the competition, excluding a senior citizen.

The season concluded on March 12, 2012, with Flajnik choosing to propose to 28-year-old model Courtney Robertson. They called off their engagement on October 26, 2012.

Production

Casting and contestants
On September 6, 2011, Flajnik was announced as the next bachelor, and he was subsequently formally named during the season finale of Bachelor Pad.

Notable contestants include Rachel Truehart, who is the sister of The Janice Dickinson Modeling Agency season 4 contestant Crystal Truehart.

Filming and development
Unlike previous seasons, traditionally, the contestants would not normally choose to stay the Villa de la Vina in Agoura Hills, California for long but it appeared for the first night. For the rest of the season, the contestants traveled to Flajnik's hometown of Sonoma and San Francisco in California; Park City, Utah; Vieques, Puerto Rico; Panama City, Panama; Belize and Switzerland. Appearances for this season included recording artist Matt Nathanson and country singer Clay Walker.

Contestants
Biographical information according to ABC official series site, plus footnoted additions.

In week 3, season 15 contestant Shawntel Newton asked to join the cast, but was eliminated by Flajnik in that rose ceremony.

Future appearances 
Bachelor Pad
Lindzi Cox, Blakeley Jones, Jamie Otis, Jaclyn Swartz, and Rachel Truehart returned for the third season of Bachelor Pad. Otis was eliminated week 4. Cox was eliminated week 6. Jones and Swartz was eliminated week 7. Truehart was eliminated week 8.

Bachelor in Paradise
Swartz returned for season 2 of Bachelor in Paradise. She was eliminated week 5.

Other appearances
Outside of Bachelor Nation, Otis later appeared in the inaugural season of Married at First Sight.

Call-out order

 The contestant received the first impression rose
 The contestant received a rose during the date
 The contestant was eliminated
 The contestant was eliminated during the date
 The contestant was eliminated outside the rose ceremony
 The contestant quit the competition
 The contestant was disqualified from the competition
 The previously eliminated contestant asked for a chance to return, but was denied
 The contestant won the competition

Episodes

Post-show
Months later, Ben and Courtney confirmed on a magazine that they had broken up for the second time for good.

Courtney married Humberto Preciado on October 16, 2020. Courtney and Humberto have two children together, Joaquin Ramon (born June 19, 2020) and Paloma Ruby (born November 21, 2021).

Notes

References

External links
ABC: The Bachelor official site
 http://theashleysrealityroundup.com/2012/10/05/another-bachelor-couple-splits-ben-courtney-are-done/

The Bachelor (American TV series) seasons
2012 American television seasons
Television shows filmed in California
Television shows filmed in Utah
Television shows filmed in Puerto Rico
Television shows filmed in Panama
Television shows filmed in Belize
Television shows filmed in Florida
Television shows filmed in Tennessee
Television shows filmed in Texas
Television shows filmed in Arizona
Television shows filmed in Switzerland